Susan James may refer to:

 Susan James (philosopher) (born 1951), British philosopher
 Susan E. James (born 1945), British historian
 Susan Saint James (born 1946), American actress and activist
 Susan James, a pen name of Rochelle Alers (born 1963), American writer of romance novels